Beckworth is a surname. Notable people named Beckworth include:

Carter Beckworth (born 1986), American singer-songwriter 
Lindley Beckworth (1913–1984), American politician
James Beckwourth (1798–1866), American mountain man, fur trader, and explorer
Karen Beckworth, EastEnders character